Milagro is the seventeenth studio album by Santana, released in 1992. Milagro, which means "miracle" in Spanish, was dedicated to the lives of Miles Davis and Bill Graham, and was Santana's first album on the Polydor label after twenty-two years with Columbia Records. The album reached 102 in the Billboard 200.

As of 2010, this is the band Santana's only studio album not owned by Sony Music Entertainment, the successor to Sony BMG, a company formed by the merger of Columbia's parent (the original) Sony Music Entertainment and BMG, the parent of Santana's current label Arista Records. The album is owned by Universal Music Group, which purchased Polydor's parent PolyGram in 1998.

Track listing
"Introduction — Bill Graham (Milagro)" (M. Johnson, Bob Marley, Carlos Santana) – 7:34
"Somewhere in Heaven" (Alex Ligertwood, Santana) – 9:59
"Saja/Right On" (Joe Roccisano/Earl DeRouen, Marvin Gaye) – 8:51
"Your Touch" (Santana, Chester D. Thompson) – 6:34
"Life Is for Living" (Pat Sefolosha) – 4:39
"Red Prophet" { Instrumental }(Benny Rietveld) – 5:35
"Agua que va caer" (Carlos Valdes, Eugene "Totico" Arango) – 4:22
"Make Somebody Happy" (Santana, Ligertwood) – 4:14
"Free All the People (South Africa)" (Jackie Holmes) – 6:04
"Gypsy/Grajonca" (Santana, Thompson) – 7:09
"We Don't Have to Wait" (Santana, Armando Peraza, Thompson) – 4:34
"A Dios" (Santana, John Coltrane, Gil Evans) – 1:21

Personnel
 Carlos Santana — guitar, vocals
 Chester D. Thompson — keyboards, horn/string arrangements, backing vocals
 Benny Rietveld — bass
 Walfredo Reyes, Jr. — Drum set, percussion
 Raul Rekow — timbales, percussion, vocals
 Karl Perazzo — timbales, guido, quinto, bongo, vocals
 Billy Johnson — drums ("Right On" and "Your Touch")
 Tony Lindsay — vocals ("Life Is for Living", "Make Somebody Happy")
 Alex Ligertwood — vocals ("Somewhere in Heaven")
 Larry Graham — vocals ("Right On")
 Rebeca Mauleon — piano ("Agua que va a caer")
 Wayne Wallace — trombone ("Agua que va caer", "Free All the People" and "Milagro")
 Bill Ortiz — trumpet ("Agua que va caer", "Free All the People" and "Milagro")
 Robert Kwock — trumpet ("Agua que va caer", "Free All the people" and "Milagro")
 Melecio Magdaluyo — saxophone ("Agua que va caer", "Free All the People" and "Milagro")
 Bad River Singers — vocal chant ("Agua que va caer")
 John Philip Shenale - string programming
 Lygia Ferragallo - backing vocals

Charts

Notes 

Santana (band) albums
1992 albums
Polydor Records albums
Albums produced by Carlos Santana